Kalinine is a village in the Krasnohvardiiske Raion (district) of the Autonomous Republic of Crimea, a territory recognized by a majority of countries as part of Ukraine and annexed by Russia. Its population is 1,156. 

Jewish village Kalinindorf probably arose in the late 1920s and early 1930s in the process of establishing Jewish settlements in Crimea. May 18, 1948, Kalinindorf renamed into Kalinine. 

The village was hosting Ukrainian professional football club Feniks-Illichovets Kalinine.

Villages in Crimea
Krasnohvardiiske Raion